A branch is a part of a woody plant.

Branch or branches may also refer to:

Places

Australia
 The Branch River, New South Wales

Canada
 Branch, Newfoundland and Labrador, a town
 Branch River (Newfoundland)

France
 Branches, Yonne, a commune

New Zealand
 Branch River (Taylor River tributary)
 Branch River (Wairau River tributary)

United States
 Branch, Arkansas, a city
 Branch, Louisiana, an unincorporated community and census-designated place
 Branch, Michigan, an unincorporated community
 Branch, Missouri, an unincorporated community
 Branch, Texas, an unincorporated community
 Branch, Wisconsin, an unincorporated community
 Branch County, Michigan
 Branch Township (disambiguation)
 Fort Branch, North Carolina, a Confederate fort in the American Civil War
 Branch River (New Hampshire)
 The Branch, also known as Branch River, New Hampshire
 Branch River (Rhode Island)
 Branch River (Wisconsin)

People
 Branch (surname), a list of people with the name
 Branch (given name), a list of people with the name
 Branch McCracken (1908–1970), American college basketball player and coach nicknamed "Branch"

Arts and entertainment
 Branch Connally, a main character in the Longmire television series
 Branch, a troll in the 2016 film Trolls
 Arthur Branch, a fictional district attorney in the Law & Order franchise
 Branches (novel), a 2000 novel-in-verse by American author Mitch Cullin
 The Branches, a 2010 EP by The Dear Hunter

Companies and organizations
 Branch office, business organization that, unlike a subsidiary, does not constitute a separate legal entity even if physically separated from the organization's main office
 Branch (banking), a retail location
 Branch, a local union, in the trade union movement
 Military branch, a component of the armed forces, such as the army, navy, or air force

Mathematics
 Branch, in graph theory, a path is a sequence of edges connecting nodes in a graph or tree
 Branch, in set theory, a maximal chain in a tree

Religion
 Branch (LDS Church), the smaller of two types of local congregation in The Church of Jesus Christ of Latter-day Saints
 Branch, in Jesus and messianic prophecy, a prophetic name attributed by Christians to Jesus

Other uses
 Branch (academia), an academic sub-discipline
 Branch (bridle), a crooked piece of iron in a bit shank
 Branch (computer science), a point in a computer program where program-flow may change depending on a condition
 Branch (hieroglyph), a member of the trees and plants hieroglyphs
 Branches, the major sub-families of a language family
 USS Branch, various US Navy ships
 Branch, a sometimes-used taxonomic rank

See also
 
 Branch line, a relatively minor railway line
 Branč
 Branche, a surname
 East Branch (disambiguation)
 North Branch (disambiguation)
 South Branch (disambiguation)
 West Branch (disambiguation)
 Long Branch (disambiguation)